Roman Wladimir Jackiw (born 8 November 1939) is a theoretical physicist and Dirac Medallist. Born in Lubliniec, Poland in 1939 to a Ukrainian family, the family later moved to Austria and Germany before settling in New York City when Jackiw was about 10.

Biography
Jackiw earned his undergraduate degree from Swarthmore College and his PhD from Cornell University in 1966 under Hans Bethe and Kenneth Wilson. He was a professor at the Massachusetts Institute of Technology Center for Theoretical Physics from 1969 until his retirement. He still retains his affiliation in emeritus status in 2019.

Jackiw co-discovered the chiral anomaly, which is also known as the Adler–Bell–Jackiw anomaly. In 1969, he and John Stewart Bell published their explanation, which was later expanded and clarified by Stephen L. Adler, of the observed decay of a neutral pion into two photons. This decay is forbidden by a symmetry of classical electrodynamics, but Bell and Jackiw showed that this symmetry cannot be preserved at the quantum level. Their introduction of an "anomalous" term from quantum field theory required that the sum of the charges of the elementary fermions had to be zero. This work also gave important support to the color-theory of quarks.

Jackiw is also known for Jackiw–Teitelboim gravity, a theory of gravity with one dimension each of space and time that includes a dilaton field. Sometimes known as the R = T model or as JT gravity, it is used to model some aspects of near-extremal black holes.

Jackiw married fellow physicist So-Young Pi, daughter of Korean writer Pi Chun-deuk. One of Jackiw's sons is Stefan Jackiw, an American violinist. The other is Nicholas Jackiw, a software designer known for inventing The Geometer's Sketchpad. His daughter, Simone Ahlborn, is an educator at Moses Brown School in Providence, Rhode Island.

Awards
Heineman Prize, 1995
On May 26, 2000 Jackiw received an honorary doctorate from the Faculty of Science and Technology  at Uppsala University, Sweden

References

External links
 MIT web page for Roman Jackiw
 Dirac Medal website's description of Jackiw's 1998 prize
 Biography of John Bell, including description of his 1969 work with Jackiw
 

1939 births
Living people
People from Lubliniec
Cornell University alumni
Fellows of the American Physical Society
Members of the United States National Academy of Sciences
American people of Ukrainian descent
American people of Polish descent
Mathematical physicists
Swarthmore College alumni
MIT Center for Theoretical Physics faculty